The 2001–02 Slovenian Football Cup was the eleventh season of the Slovenian Football Cup, Slovenia's football knockout competition.

Qualified clubs

2000–01 Slovenian PrvaLiga members
Celje
Domžale
Dravograd
Gorica
Koper
Korotan Prevalje
Maribor
Mura
Olimpija
Primorje
Tabor Sežana
Rudar Velenje

Qualified through MNZ Regional Cups
MNZ Ljubljana: Ljubljana, Elan, Kolpa
MNZ Maribor: Železničar Maribor, Rogoza, Paloma
MNZ Celje: Šmartno, Šmarje pri Jelšah
MNZ Koper: Ankaran, Jadran Dekani
MNZ Nova Gorica: Brda, Tolmin
MNZ Murska Sobota: Beltinci, Bakovci
MNZ Lendava: Odranci, Nafta Lendava
MNZG-Kranj: Triglav Kranj, Šenčur
MNZ Ptuj: Ormož, Aluminij

First round

|}

Round of 16

|}

Quarter-finals

|}

Semi-finals

|}

Final

First leg

Second leg

References

Slovenian Football Cup seasons
Cup
Slovenian Cup